Gimme .... Live is the first live album by Australian band The Radiators. The album was released in March 1988 and peaked at number 50 on the Australian Albums Chart.

Track listing

Charts

References

The Radiators (Australian band) albums
1988 live albums
Live albums by Australian artists
Mercury Records live albums